Events in the year 1921 in Spain.

Incumbents
Monarch: Alfonso XIII
Prime Minister:
 until 8 March: Eduardo Dato
 8 March-13 March: Gabino Bugallal
 13 March-14 August: Manuel Allendesalazar
 starting 14 August: Antonio Maura

Events

 March 8 - Prime Minister Eduardo Dato Iradier is assassinated while on his way home from the parliament building in Madrid

Births
 August 9 - Elías Amézaga (died 2008)

Deaths

March 8 - Eduardo Dato e Iradier (b. 1856)
April 7 - Víctor Mirecki Larramat (b. 1847)

References

 
Years of the 20th century in Spain
1920s in Spain
Spain
Spain